Emmanuel Kofi Essien (born 2 July 2001) is a Ghanaian professional footballer who currently play as a central midfielder who is currently a free agent who previously played for Skenderbeu and Sant Rafel.

References

2001 births
Living people
People from Accra
Ghanaian footballers
Association football midfielders